Nairoby Abigail Jiménez Ramírez (born 22 October 2000) is a Dominican Republic badminton player She competed at the 2018 Central American and Caribbean Games in Barranquilla, Colombia, and won the bronze medal in the mixed doubles event partnered with Nelson Javier.

Achievements

Central American and Caribbean Games 
Mixed doubles

BWF International Challenge/Series 
Women's singles

Women's doubles

Mixed doubles

  BWF International Challenge tournament
  BWF International Series tournament
  BWF Future Series tournament

References

External links 
 

2000 births
Living people
Dominican Republic female badminton players
Badminton players at the 2019 Pan American Games
Pan American Games competitors for the Dominican Republic
Central American and Caribbean Games bronze medalists for the Dominican Republic
Competitors at the 2018 Central American and Caribbean Games
Badminton players at the 2018 Summer Youth Olympics
Central American and Caribbean Games medalists in badminton
21st-century Dominican Republic women